Kevin Gelshenen Rafferty II (May 25, 1947 – July 2, 2020) was an American documentary film cinematographer, director, and producer, best known for his 1982 documentary The Atomic Cafe.

Background
Rafferty was born in Boston on May 25, 1947. He studied architecture at Harvard and film at the California Institute of the Arts. He helped teach the craft of filmmaking to Michael Moore during the production of Roger & Me in 1989, and Moore has acknowledged Rafferty's influence on his own filmmaking.  Rafferty teamed up with his brother Pierce and Jayne Loader
to produce the cult classic documentary film The Atomic Cafe. He was the director, producer, editor and cinematographer of many documentary projects, including Blood in the Face, The War Room, Feed, and The Last Cigarette. His last project was Harvard Beats Yale 29-29.

Rafferty was a nephew of Barbara Bush, and a cousin of George W. Bush.

Rafferty died from cancer at his home in Manhattan on July 2, 2020, at age 73.

Filmography

As director or producer
Harvard Beats Yale 29-29   (2008) 
Who Wants to Be President?   (2000)
The Last Cigarette   (1999/I)
Feed   (1992)
Blood in the Face   (1991)
Radio Bikini  (1988)
The Atomic Cafe   (1982)
Hurry Tomorrow (1975)

As cinematographer
Good Money   (1996)
The War Room   (1993)
Roger & Me   (1989)

As himself
Manufacturing Dissent   (2007)
SexTV (2003) (TV)

Reception
Thom Powers of Harvardwood writes that Rafferty is "renowned for his wit and fresh perspectives on American culture". His various films have received positive reception.  Of Hurry Tomorrow, Rafferty's documentary indictment of a California State psychiatric hospital, Colin Bennet of The Age wrote "Its anger and courage are the kind that lead to reform".  
Michael Atkinson of IFC calls Rafferty's latest, Harvard Beats Yale 29-29, "a hypnotic pleasure," and Fast Company calls it an "engrossing documentary" which was "the best sports film we've seen in years", and Manohla Dargis of New York Times writes "while it seems absurd to include such a picayune event in the annals, the filmmaker Kevin Rafferty makes the case for remembrance and for the art of the story in his preposterously entertaining documentary Harvard Beats Yale 29-29".

The Atomic Cafe had received praise as one of the best Cold War movies of all time.

Accolades
1991, nomination, Grand Jury Prize for Blood in the Face by Sundance Film Festival
1983, nomination, Flaherty Documentary Award for Best Documentary for The Atomic Cafe by British Academy of Film and Television Arts
2016, The Atomic Cafe selected to the National Film Registry

References

External links
 
 Kevin Rafferty at All Movie Guide

1947 births
2020 deaths
American documentary filmmakers
Bush family
California Institute of the Arts alumni
Collage filmmakers
Deaths from cancer in New York (state)
Film directors from New York City
Film producers from New York (state)
Harvard Graduate School of Design alumni